The 1979 Tolly Cobbold Classic was a professional invitational snooker tournament which took place between 20 and 21 February 1979 at the Corn Exchange, Ipswich, England.

Four professionals played in a round-robin group, with the top two progressing to the final. Alex Higgins won the tournament by defeating Ray Reardon 5–4 in the final.

Main draw

Round-Robin

Final

References

Tolly Cobbold Classic
Tolly Cobbold Classic
Tolly Cobbold Classic
Tolly Cobbold Classic